Kshetram (Kshetra) literally means a place.  In Hindu mythology, it is referred to as the physical holy location where a temple or a collection of temples, its tank and deities exist.

Sacred geography
There exist privileged regions and places where energy in the form of terrestrial magnetism rises heavenward.  As per Hindu religious mythology, Prana (gravity) pulls life downwards, while apanan (levity) pulls life upwards.  Such places are called Tirtha (ways), Kshetra (ways) or pitha (base).  Sacred geography can identify sacred places and sometimes explain the importance of those which are already known.

The dwelling of gods must be built on such privileged ground (kshetras), and, as a rule, sacred cities arise around them. The temple should be close to a water course or near a lake located to the east or north. For the building of a temple, it should have a lake on the left (north) or in front (east), and not otherwise. If the temple is built on an island, the presence of water all around is of good omen.

See also

Hindu
Hindu calendar
Hindu deities
Hindu denominations
Hindu mythology
Hinduism by country
List of Hindu temples
List of notable Hindus
List of related articles
Tirtha and Kshetra
Theertham

References

Hindu temple architecture